Schistura kohatensis is a species of ray-finned fish, a stone loach, in the genus Schistura.

The freshwater fish is endemic to Pakistan.

Footnotes 
 

K
Freshwater fish of Pakistan
Endemic fauna of Pakistan
Fish described in 1981
Taxa named by Petre Mihai Bănărescu